Diadegma contractum is a wasp first described by Carl Gustav Alexander Brischke in 1880.
No subspecies are listed.

References

contractum
Insects described in 1880